Newent railway station served the town of Newent.

The station had two platforms on a passing loop, a goods shed to the west and several sidings, one of which was equipped with a 5 ton crane. The goods yard was able to accommodate live stock and a full range of goods.

The station was host to a GWR camp coach in 1935, 1938 and 1939.

The station closed for passengers on 13 July 1959, but the line remained open for freight traffic until 1964. It was located opposite what is now the Newent fire station. The buttresses of the Station Bridge can be seen intact on nearby Station Road.

As of 2011 there was a proposal by the Herefordshire and Gloucestershire Canal Trust to reopen the 34 mile Herefordshire and Gloucestershire Canal upon which the railway was built.

References

Bibliography

Further reading

Disused railway stations in Gloucestershire
Former Great Western Railway stations
Railway stations in Great Britain opened in 1885
Railway stations in Great Britain closed in 1959
1885 establishments in England
1959 disestablishments in England
Newent